This is a listing of the horses that finished in either first, second, or third place and the number of starters in the Chick Lang Stakes, a grade 3 American thoroughbred race on dirt at six furlongs at Pimlico Race Course in Baltimore, Maryland formerly known as the Hirsch Jacobs Stakes.

A † designates an American Champion or Eclipse Award winner.

References 

Lists of horse racing results
Pimlico Race Course